Álvaro Jordan (8 January 1962 in Cali, Colombia-January 11, 2001) was a male tennis player from Colombia.

Jordan represented his native country in the doubles competition at the 1988 Summer Olympics in Seoul, South Korea, partnering Luis Arturo González. The pair was eliminated in the first round there, withdrawing prior to playing.

Jordan played in 15 Davis Cup ties for Colombia from 1984 to 1992, posting a 20–10 record in singles and a 6–7 record in doubles.

Jordan's highest ranking in singles was world No. 226, which he reached on July, 1992.  His highest doubles ranking was World No. 181, which he reached on May, 1987.

Jordan died in Cali in 2001.

References

External links
 
 

1962 births
2001 deaths
Colombian male tennis players
Olympic tennis players of Colombia
People from Cali
Tennis players at the 1988 Summer Olympics
20th-century Colombian people
21st-century Colombian people